Samson and Delilah is a 2009 Australian drama film directed by Warwick Thornton and starring Rowan McNamara and Marissa Gibson, both young first-time actors. The film depicts two Indigenous Australian 14-year-olds living in a remote Aboriginal community who steal a car and escape their difficult lives by going to Alice Springs. It won many awards, including the Caméra d'Or at Cannes for best first feature.

Plot 
Samson and Delilah are 14-year-olds who live in an Aboriginal community near Alice Springs in Central Australia. Samson is a mute boy living in a run-down shelter with his brother's band playing ska music all day right outside his bedroom. He sniffs petrol every morning. Samson is interested in Delilah, who lives with her grandmother, and throws a rock at her outside the local convenience store. In spite of mocking encouragement from her grandmother, Delilah is not interested in him. Samson spends a day following Delilah around and attempts to move in with Delilah.

Delilah's grandmother dies and the old women blame her "neglect" for the death and thrash her. Samson in a fit of rage beats his brother to shut him and his band up but his brother beats him up.

Samson steals a car and takes Delilah to Alice Springs where they live rough under a bridge over the dry bed of the Todd River. Gonzo, a deranged homeless man living there, helps them. Samson continues to sniff petrol. At one point, he gets so high that he does not notice when Delilah is taken by a group of white teenagers in a car. She is raped and bashed, but eventually comes back to Samson, who is unconscious. She begins sniffing petrol, too. With Samson again dazed by petrol, they are walking along the street and Delilah is hit by a car. When Samson eventually comes to and realises she has been hit, he believes she is dead and cuts off his hair as a sign of respect. He spends weeks sitting in the same position under the bridge sniffing petrol as a means of getting over her death. She comes back and rescues Samson, and they are both brought back to their village. As they arrive, one of the old women begins to beat Samson for stealing the community's only car. Delilah decides to take Samson to a secluded area for rehabilitation, and to get over his petrol sniffing habit. Eventually Samson stops sniffing petrol, and over time Delilah is able to coax him back to his original state.

Cast
 Rowan McNamara as Samson
 Marissa Gibson as Delilah
 Mitjili Napanangka Gibson as Nana
 Scott Thornton as Gonzo
 Matthew Gibson as Samson's Brother
 Steven Brown as Drummer
 Gregwyn Gibson as Bass Player
 Noreen Robertson Nampijinpa as Fighting Woman
 Kenrick Martin as Wheelchair Boy
 Peter Bartlett as Storekeeper

Production
The film was directed by Warwick Thornton, who describes it as a "survival love story". Both lead actors, Rowan McNamara and Marissa Gibson, were young first-time actors.

Release
The film was selected for screening in numerous Australian and international festivals, including Cannes; Adelaide Film Festival (where it won the Audience Award); Berlin Independent Film Festival; Around the World in 14 Films; St Tropez Film Festival; and others.

Reception
Based on 48 reviews, the film held a 94% Fresh rating on the film review aggregator Rotten Tomatoes in 2009, with an average rating of 7.8/10. The critical consensus states that "Alternately beautiful and heartrending, Samson and Delilah is terrifically acted and shot, and presents a complex portrait of what it means to be Australian."

Samson and Delilah received five stars from both Margaret Pomeranz and David Stratton on At The Movies, and was the only film to receive such a rating from the hosts in 2009.

Craig Mathieson of SBS awarded the director's debut feature film four stars out of five, commenting that "the picture has an intrinsic sweetness, a genuine belief in the power of an individual’s love, but it is offset by a brutal worldview."

Accolades
The film competed in the Un Certain Regard section at the 2009 Cannes Film Festival, winning the Caméra d'Or ('Gold Camera Award' for best first feature film) at the 2009 Cannes Film Festival. The film also won the Asia Pacific Screen Award for Best Film in 2009. 

Screen Australia announced on 29 September 2009 that the film had been nominated as Australia's official entry in the Academy Awards Best Foreign Language Film category.

Awards

Box office
Samson and Delilah grossed  at the box office in Australia.

See also
 Cinema of Australia

References

External links
 
 

2009 films
2000s English-language films
2009 drama films
Australian drama films
Films set in the Northern Territory
Films about Aboriginal Australians
Samson
Caméra d'Or winners
2009 directorial debut films
Screen Australia films